The Uru language, more specifically known as Iru-Itu, and Uchumataqu, is an extinct language formerly spoken by the Uru people. In 2004, it had 2 remaining native speakers out of an ethnic group of 140 people in the La Paz Department, Bolivia near Lake Titicaca, the rest having shifted to Aymara and Spanish. The language is close enough to the Chipaya language to sometimes be considered a dialect of that language.

Uru is also called Ochosuma (Uchuzuma), a historical name for the Uru ethnic group.

Olson (1964) mentions a variety of Uru, Uru of Ch'imu, spoken on the Isla del Sol in Lake Titicaca. It is not clear if this was a dialect of Iru Itu or a separate Uru language.

Identifying Uchumataqu
Since one of the Urus' names for their language was "Pukina", Uchumataqu has previously been mistakenly identified with Puquina. While the personal and possessive pronouns of the unrelated Puquina bear limited similarities to those of Arawakan languages, Uru differs drastically from Arawakan languages in its person-marking system and its morphology. The pronoun system of Uchumataqu is naturally very similar instead to its close relative Chipaya. Uchumataqu has also borrowed grammatical and lexical morphemes from prolonged exposure to Aymara, with which it is not related, however.  Unlike Aymara, Uru is not polysynthetic and has a phonemic five-vowel system /a e i o u/, while Aymara has a three-vowel system /a i u/. One contrast between Uru and the related Chipaya is that Uru does not identify gender morphologically as Chipaya does.

References

Languages of Bolivia
Uru–Chipaya languages
Endangered indigenous languages of the Americas